Early Tracks may refer to:

 Early Tracks (EP), a 2000 EP by Old 97's
 Early Tracks (album), a 1987 album by Steve Earle